Torpedo Squadron 8 (VT-8) was a United States Navy squadron of World War II torpedo bombers. VT-8 was assigned initially to the air group of the aircraft carrier , joining the ship shortly after her commissioning in October 1941.

When Saratoga was disabled on 31 August, VT-8 was transferred to Henderson Field on Guadalcanal, operating there until November 1942. Due to heavy cumulative losses on Guadalcanal, VT-8 was then withdrawn and disbanded.

A second VT-8 was established in 1943, and served on  until the end of the war.

Midway
VT-8's first and best-known combat mission came during the Battle of Midway on 4 June 1942. Flying obsolete Douglas TBD Devastators, all of Lieutenant Commander John C. Waldron's fifteen planes were shot down during their unescorted torpedo attack on Imperial Japanese Navy aircraft carriers. The squadron failed to damage any Japanese carriers or destroy enemy aircraft.

Only one member of VT-8 who flew from Hornet on that day survived in the action, Ensign George Gay. Gay was rescued the day following the battle. VT-8 was afterwards awarded the American Presidential Unit Citation.

Just prior to the Battle of Midway, the reconstituted VT-8 was the first squadron equipped with the new Grumman TBF-1 Avenger, a bigger, faster, longer-ranged replacement for the TBD. When Hornet sailed to the Pacific, a detachment of the squadron under the command of Lieutenant Harold "Swede" Larsen remained in Norfolk, Virginia to receive the first shipment of the new aircraft. Larsen's detachment arrived at Pearl Harbor the day after Hornet sailed for Midway Island. Six of the squadron's Avengers were flown to Midway under the command of Lieutenant Langdon K. Fieberling to participate in the battle. These planes were the first Navy aircraft to attack the Japanese fleet that day. They attacked without fighter cover, and five of the Avengers were shot down, with only Ensign Albert K. Earnest and Radioman 2nd Class Harry Ferrier surviving, on a badly shot-up plane with damaged controls and landing gear, and a dead rear-gunner.

VT-8's losses have been attributed to several causes. Hornets CAG, Commander Stanhope C. Ring, kept the group's fighter escort at high altitude in order to cover the dive bombers and to give the Wildcats an altitude advantage. This decision was supported by Admiral Marc Mitscher, then commanding officer of  Hornet. The Wildcats' deployment was ultimately of no consequence, however, as Ring led the group on an incorrect heading, so the dive bombers never made contact with the Japanese fleet. Commander Waldron made repeated attempts to take over the formation by radio before leading VT-8 off on his own. Waldron's initiative coupled with Ring's faulty tactics led to VT-8 attacking the Japanese force without fighter or dive bomber support. It is important to note, however, that all of the carrier-based torpedo squadrons suffered heavily in the battle, including VT-3, which attacked with fighter escort.

Larsen's detachment of VT-8 that remained at Pearl Harbor was loaded aboard  when she was sent to reinforce the forces at Midway. They were later transferred to Hornet where they learned of the loss of their comrades. VT-8 was reconstituted with this detachment as nucleus and was reassigned to Saratoga.

South Pacific
VT-8 flew from Saratoga during the initial stages of the Guadalcanal Campaign. In the Battle of the Eastern Solomons, VT-8 assisted in sinking the light carrier . When Saratoga was torpedoed by a Japanese submarine, the squadron was assigned to Henderson Field on Guadalcanal, where it served as part of the Cactus Air Force. VTR-8 fought there to the point where all aircraft were disabled, and then operated as a single-aircraft unit, as one plane at a time was put back into service by salvaging parts (often themselves damaged) from other planes. VT-8 pilots and air crew also participated in the ground defense of Henderson Field, assisting to fend off Japanese infantry attacks on 24–26 October 1942. VT-8's last official mission was flown on 15 November 1942, against damaged transports from the last major Japanese convoy to the island. After leaving Guadalcanal and returning to the United States, the squadron was disbanded.

Central Pacific
A new Torpedo Squadron 8 was established in 1943 as part of the new Carrier Air Group 8 (CVG-8). It was assigned to the newly commissioned aircraft carrier  at Norfolk in November 1943. After training in the Caribbean Sea, VT-8 left Intrepid at Pearl Harbor in January 1944. VT-8 attacked Palau, Yap, Ulithi, and Woleai on 30 March and 1 April 1944. Truk, Satawan, Ponape, and Hollandia on New Guinea were attacked a month later. CVG-8 then took part in the Marianas Campaign between 12 June and 10 August 1944. VT-8 flew sorties in the Battle of the Philippine Sea and the Battle of Leyte Gulf. The Western Carolines were attacked in September, Okinawa, Luzon, and Formosa were attacked in October and November 1944. For this deployment on Bunker Hill, CVG-8 was awarded a Presidential Unit Citation.

In June 1945, VT-8 trained with USS Saratoga, but they did not deploy. CVG-8 (including VT-8) was disestablished after the end of the war.

Awards
Torpedo Eight earned two Presidential Unit Citations: one for Midway, and one for Guadalcanal. Its members also earned more than fifty medals for valor in combat.

Gallery

Literature
Herman Wouk's novel War and Remembrance pays tribute to Torpedo 8, whose pilots he called "the soul of America in action."

References

Bibliography

External links

 
 Torpedo Squadron 8 photograph, US Navy Historical Center
 History of Torpedo Squadron 8, US Navy

Torpedo squadrons of the United States Navy
8th Torpedo Squadron (Navy)
Battle of Midway